Kidasi is a village in the Paphos District of Cyprus, located 4 km northeast of Trakhypedhoula.

References

Communities in Paphos District